is an album by GO!GO!7188, released in 2001.

Track listing 

2001 albums
GO!GO!7188 albums